Top Model is a Scandinavian reality television show, based on Tyra Banks' America's Next Top Model. It was broadcast on TV3 in Denmark, Norway and Sweden by Viasat in 2005 and 2006. A second adaptation of the show featuring plus-sized models was produced by the network in 2016.

Format 

The competition was divided into three separate competitions: Denmark, Norway and Sweden. Each contest began with a group of twenty-something national semi-finalists that were narrowed down to nine national finalists in the first episode. Each episode, one contestant was eliminated, until there were just three contestants remaining in each competition. At that point, the three competitions would merge into one overall competition. The last contestant standing from each country competed in the finale, and from this group a winner was chosen.

The individual hosts for each country were Anne Pedersen in Denmark, Kathrine Sørland in Norway, and Mini Andén in Sweden. Andén left the show after the first two seasons and was replaced by Malin Persson for the third. The merged competition was hosted by Georgianna Robertson in season 1 and Cynthia Garrett in seasons 2 and 3.

The show ran for three seasons, after which the countries parted ways and began their own individual adaptions of Top Model. In 2016, a new series, Top Model Curves, which includes contestants from all three countries, was broadcast. The winner of season 1 of Top Model was Kine Bakke, who represented Norway. Season 2 was won by Frøydis Elvenes, also representing Norway. Season 3 was won by Freja Kjellberg Borchies, representing Sweden.

Seasons

See also
Danmarks Næste Topmodel
Top Model Norge
Top Model Sverige
Top Model Curves

References

Scandinavia
Danish reality television series
Swedish reality television series
Norwegian reality television series
2005 Norwegian television series debuts
2005 Swedish television series debuts
2005 Danish television series debuts
2000s Norwegian television series
2000s Swedish television series
2000s Danish television series
TV3 (Norway) original programming
TV3 (Denmark) original programming
TV3 (Sweden) original programming
Non-American television series based on American television series